William George Bradley Craven, 5th Earl of Craven (31 July 1897 – 15 September 1932) was a British peer.

Early life
Craven was born on 31 July 1897 at Combe Abbey, Warwickshire and was baptized by the Archbishop of York on 27 August 1897. He was the only child of William Craven, 4th Earl of Craven (1868–1921), and his American wife, Cornelia Martin (1877–1961).

His paternal grandparents were George Craven, 3rd Earl of Craven and Lady Evelyn Barrington (the second daughter and co-heiress of George Barrington, 7th Viscount Barrington). His mother was the only daughter of Bradley Martin and his wife Cornelia, who were famed as the hosts of the Bradley-Martin Ball.

Craven was educated at Eton College.

Career
Craven "attained his majority in 1918, when his father paid all of his then existing debts", but by September 1919 he was bankrupt with "unsecured liabilities" of £13,610 to assets of only £302. He inherited the earldom at age 23 upon the accidental drowning of his father William Craven, 4th Earl of Craven on 9 July 1921.

The 5th Earl served during the World War I as a Lieutenant with the 3rd Bn. Royal Hampshire Regiment and was wounded in action, losing a leg and sustaining a serious arm injury.

At one time, Lord Craven was mentioned as a possible successor to Lord Byng as Governor-General of Canada.

Personal life
On 14 October 1911, when known by the courtesy title Viscount Uffington, he married Mary Williamina George, daughter of William George, the town clerk of Invergordon. Together they had one son:

 William Robert Bradley Craven (1917–1965).

In 1922, shortly after inheriting the earldom, Lord Craven was named in the divorce suit between George Cathcart, 5th Earl Cathcart and Lady Cathcart, the former Vera Estelle Warter. Lord Cathcart obtained a "decree dissolving his marriage with Lady Cathcart, upon proof being given of her indiscretions with the Earl of Craven". Eighteen months after the Cathcart divorce, the Countess eloped to South Africa with Lord Craven. In 1925, Lady Craven sued the Earl for divorce and named Vera, Countess Cathcart, as the woman in the case. In 1926, Lord Craven and Lady Cathcart were again the centre of controversy when arriving to the United States. "While the Countess was held at Ellis Island, a write for his arrest was issued, but he departed for Canada in time to prevent its being served. His wife joined him in Canada, and they left together for Berumda," with Lord Craven denying he was ever "guilty of any moral turpitude".

Death
Lord Craven died on 15 September 1932 of peritonitis at Pau, France, at the age of 35. He was succeeded by his son, William Robert Bradley Craven, 6th Earl of Craven, upon his death on 15 September 1932. The Earl and Countess stayed married and she survived him by 42 years, dying in 1974.

References

External links

Coat of arms

1897 births
1932 deaths
British people of American descent
20th-century British landowners
Deaths from peritonitis
William
Earls of Craven (1801 creation)
20th-century English nobility
Royal Hampshire Regiment officers
British Army personnel of World War I
English amputees
Royalty and nobility with disabilities